Wijhe is a railway station located in Wijhe, Olst-Wijhe, The Netherlands. The station was opened on 1 October 1866 and is located on the Deventer - Zwolle section of the Arnhem–Leeuwarden railway. The train services are operated by Nederlandse Spoorwegen. The station was closed between 15 May 1936 and 1 June 1940.

Train services
, the following train services call at this station:
2× per hour express Intercity service: Zwolle - Deventer - Arnhem - Nijmegen - 's-Hertogenbosch - Breda - Roosendaal

References

External links
NS website 
Dutch Public Transport journey planner 

Railway stations in Overijssel
Railway stations opened in 1866
Railway stations on the Staatslijn A
Railway stations on the IJssellijn
1866 establishments in the Netherlands
Olst-Wijhe
Railway stations in the Netherlands opened in the 19th century